Morris is an unincorporated community in Morris Township, Tioga County, in the U.S. state of Pennsylvania. It lies at the junction of state routes 414 and 287, between Williamsport and Wellsboro. Babb Creek, a tributary of Pine Creek, flows through Morris.

Activities in Morris include an annual Rattlesnake Round-Up that features snake hunts. The village is about 25 minutes by car from the Pine Creek Gorge and the Pine Creek Rail Trail, to the west. Campgrounds in the area—Twin Streams in Morris, Stony Fork Creek near the village of Stony Fork, Leonard Harrison State Park west of Wellsboro, and Pettecote Junction in Cedar Run—offer a variety of sites for tents and recreational vehicles.

References

Unincorporated communities in Tioga County, Pennsylvania
Unincorporated communities in Pennsylvania